Joshua Ritson CBE (16 June 1874 in Farlam – 5 February 1955 in Sunderland) was a British Labour politician who served as Member of Parliament (MP) for the City of Durham. He was elected in 1922, unseated in 1931, and re-elected in 1935 and remained in Parliament until 1945. He is known for his representation of the Durham miners. He became mayor of Sunderland in 1945, and was appointed the C.B.E. Order of the British Empire in 1949. In 1951 he was made Roll of Honorary Freeman of the former Borough of Sunderland.

Quotes
"The day has passed when we had to take off our hats to the squire and bow to the bishop"

Personal
Born in 1874, he was the son of Joshua Ritson from Bampton, Cumberland  and his wife Ann. His older brother John Ritson was President of the Northern Colliery Officials Association. In 1900, he married Elizabeth, the daughter of Irvin Dinning. His great-niece is Labour Party politician Baroness Joyce Quin (b. 1944), the daughter of Basil Godfrey Quin and Ida Ritson (b. 1907) the daughter of Joshua's older brother, David Ritson.

See also
List of MPs elected in the United Kingdom general election of: 1922, 1923, 1924, 1929 and 1935

References

External links
Joshua Ritson, age 6, 1881 Censor Record, Durham Mining Museum
 

1874 births
1955 deaths
Labour Party (UK) MPs for English constituencies
Miners' Federation of Great Britain-sponsored MPs
UK MPs 1922–1923
UK MPs 1923–1924
UK MPs 1924–1929
UK MPs 1929–1931
UK MPs 1935–1945
Politicians from Carlisle, Cumbria
Mayors of places in North East England
Commanders of the Order of the British Empire
Members of the Parliament of the United Kingdom for City of Durham